Betty Boop's Little Pal is a 1934 Fleischer Studios animated short film starring Betty Boop, and featuring Pudgy the Puppy (in his first appearance).

Plot
Betty and her puppy Pudgy are on a picnic, but find it hard to enjoy the day when Pudgy ruins it and is sent home. Meanwhile, a dogcatcher is intent on capturing Pudgy, but the other dogs in the catcher's cage manage to escape him, and soon the two are reunited happily.

Notes
 This is the last Betty Boop cartoon in which Betty wears her famous flapper suit.
 This is the first time Betty spanks Pudgy for punishment.
 Clips of the redrawn colorized version were used in the compilation movie Betty Boop For President: The Movie (1980).

References

External links
 Betty Boop's Little Pal at the Big Cartoon Database.
 Betty Boop's Little Pal on YouTube.
 

1934 short films
Betty Boop cartoons
1930s American animated films
American black-and-white films
1934 animated films
Paramount Pictures short films
Fleischer Studios short films
Short films directed by Dave Fleischer
1930s English-language films
American animated short films
Animated films about dogs